Calvão is a parish in Vagos Municipality, Portugal. This village belongs to the Aveiro District near the sea coast, in the Centro Region of the country. The population in 2011 was 2,014, in an area of 14.84 km2.

Notable residents
 Guilherme Matos

References

External links
 Calvão at freguesiasdeportugal.com 
 Administration Information about Calvão 

Freguesias of Vagos